Manik may refer to:

Manik (2005 film), a 2005 Indian Bengali-language film
Manik (1961 film), a 1961 Indian Bengali-language film
Manik or T. J. Perkins (born 1984), American professional wrestler

People with the surname Manik
Moosa Manik (born 1964), Maldivian footballer
Mikuláš Maník (born 1975), Slovak chess grandmaster

See also

Manic (disambiguation)
Manek, given name and surname